Marston House may refer to:

in England
Marston House (Somerset), Grade II* listed building in Marston Bigot Park near Frome, Somerset, England

in the United States
(by state then city)
Collins-Marston House, Mobile, Alabama, listed on the National Register of Historic Places (NRHP)
Greene-Marston House, Mobile, Alabama, NRHP-listed
Marston House (Clarendon, Arkansas), listed on the NRHP in Monroe County
George W. Marston House, San Diego, California, listed on the NRHP in San Diego County
Burnham-Marston House, San Diego, California, listed on the NRHP in San Diego County
Marston House (Clinton, Louisiana), listed on the NRHP in East Feliciana Parish
William Marston House, Barnstable, Massachusetts, listed on the NRHP in Barnstable County
Arthur R. Hoard House, also known as George P. Marston House, Fort Atkinson, Wisconsin, listed on the NRHP in Jefferson County